François-Xavier Ortoli (16 February 1925 – 30 November 2007) was a French politician who served as the 5th President of the European Commission from 1973 to 1977. He served as Minister of the Economy of France from 1968 to 1969.

Ortoli served with the Free French Forces during World War II and was decorated with the Croix de guerre, Médaille militaire and Médaille de la Résistance. He served in various ministerial capacities in the 1968–1969 administration of Prime Minister of France Maurice Couve de Murville including Finance Minister. Ortoli was one of the two French European Commissioners from 1973 to 1985 holding various portfolios, serving as the fifth President of the European Commission between 1973 and 1977 leading the Ortoli Commission. He was later director of Marceau Investissements and President of Total. Ortoli was also the grandfather of Antoine-Xavier Troesch, a formerly eminent investment banker. Together with Étienne Davignon he attended the founding meeting of the European Round Table of Industrialists in Paris in 1983.

See also
Ortoli Commission

References

External links
Xnhuanet – News of death

1925 births
2007 deaths
Politicians from Ajaccio
Union of Democrats for the Republic politicians
Rally for the Republic politicians
Union for a Popular Movement politicians
French Ministers of National Education
French Ministers of Finance
Deputies of the 4th National Assembly of the French Fifth Republic
Presidents of the European Commission
French European Commissioners
TotalEnergies people
École nationale d'administration alumni
French military personnel of World War II
Recipients of the Croix de Guerre 1939–1945 (France)
Recipients of the Resistance Medal
European Commissioners 1973–1977
European Commissioners 1977–1981
European Commissioners 1981–1985